Jo Ishq Ki Marzi Woh Rab Ki Marzi is an Indian television series that premiered on Sahara One on 9 March 2009. The story revolves around the lives of two 'Zamindar' (rich landlords) families who turn from friends to enemies.

Rupali Ahuja...Kalki 
Neha Marda ... Sunaina
Neil Bhatt ... Sumer/Veer
Pankaj Kalra ... Udhayveer (Sumer's father)
Amit Pachori ... Balveer
Vijay Bhatia ... Karamveer
Jayati Bhatia

References

External links
Jo Ishq Ki Marzi Woh Rab Ki Marzi News Article

Indian television soap operas
Sahara One original programming
2009 Indian television series debuts
2009 Indian television series endings